Iepureni may refer to several places in Romania:

 Iepureni, a river in Iași County
 Iepureni, a village in Andrieșeni Commune, Iași County
 Iepureni, a village in Movileni Commune, Iași County

and a village in Moldova:
 Iepureni, a village in Cania Commune, Cantemir district